Qatar is a Muslim-majority country with Islam as the state religion. Salafi version of Islam is the state sponsored brand of Sunni Islam in the country, making Qatar one of the two Salafi states in the Muslim world, along with Saudi Arabia.

The local population, made up of Qataris, are all Muslims although there are high numbers of foreign workers in Qatar which varies the Muslim population. According to the CIA World Factbook, as of 2010 an estimated 67.7% of the population is Muslim, while 13.8% is Christian, another 13.8% Hindu, and 3.1% Buddhist. Foreign workers are well noted in the country, mainly from South Asia which constitute most of the population of Qatar. At the end of 2013, there were a total of 1,848 mosques recorded in the country.

History
Islam spread over the entire Arabian region in the 7th century in a string of widespread conflicts resulting in the Islamization of the native Arabian pagans. Muhammad sent his first military envoy, Al-Ala'a Al-Hadrami, to Munzir ibn Sawa Al Tamimi, the ruler of the region of Bahrain, which extended from the coast of Kuwait to the south of Qatar, in the year 628 AD inviting him to accept Islam as he had invited other kingdoms and empires of his time such as Byzantium and Persia. Munzir, responding to Muhammad, announced his acceptance of Islam, and most of the inhabitants of Qatar became Muslim, heralding the beginning of the Islamic era in Qatar.

It is likely that some settled populations in Qatar did not immediately convert to Islam. Isaac of Nineveh, a 7th-century Syriac Christian bishop regarded as a saint in some churches, was born in Qatar. Other notable Christian scholars dating to this period who hailed from Beth Qatraye include Dadisho Qatraya, Gabriel of Qatar and Ahob of Qatar. By the end of the 7th century, however, most of the Christians had either converted to Islam or migrated elsewhere.

During Islam's early years, Qatar's inhabitants are thought to have subscribed to the radical Khawarij ideology. During the Second Fitna, a renowned Khariji commander named Qatari ibn al-Fuja'a, who was described as the most popular and powerful Khariji leader, led the Azariqa, a sub-sect of the Khawarij, in to numerous battles. He held the title of Amir al-Mu'minin and ruled over the radical Azariqa movement for more than 10 years. Born in Al Khuwayr in Qatar, he also minted the first known Kharjite coins, the earliest of which dated to 688 or 689. The historic flag flown by Qatar was plain red, in correspondence with the red banner traditionally used by the Kharjite Muslims.

Islam in education

At a tertiary level of education Islamic Studies is taught at Qatar University, and at Hamad Bin Khalifa University's (HBKU) Faculty of Islamic Studies where a master's degree is offered. Sheikha Moza bint Nasser, the consort of the Father Emir and mother of current Emir, is the most notable graduate.

Education City is also home to the Center for Islamic Legislation and Ethics [CILE], a think tank founded in 2012 and headed by Swiss political philosopher Professor Tariq Ramadan, of Oxford University.

Islam's role in scientific discovery has also been an area of interest for the Qatar Foundation, and recently, the Society for Muslim Scientists was established with prominent members. In 2010, the joint venture between Bloomsbury Publishing and Qatar Foundation began, which saw them publish the book, ‘Science in Islam’.

Qatar's religious ministry uses the Fanar, Qatar Islamic Cultural Center as an outreach center for Islam. Fanar Culture Center is involved in several social, religious and educational activities. In addition to housing one of the largest mosques in Qatar, the center also publishes religious studies and provides lessons in Arabic and Islam. Among Fanar's facilities is a library with Islamic literature and manuscripts.

Demography

Sunni Islam
Sunnis account for the majority of Qatar's Muslim population at upwards of 90%. Most Sunnis adhere to the Salafi interpretation of Islam. The country's state mosque is Imam Muhammad ibn Abd al-Wahhab Mosque, which was named in honor of the Salafi Muhammad ibn Abd al-Wahhab of the Najd.

Shia Islam
Shiites comprise around 10% of Qatar's Muslim population. Several of Qatar's most notable merchant families have historically been Shia. Qatari Shiites are granted religious liberty and some have held government positions. In contrast to the Shiites in nearby Bahrain, the Qatari Shiites have an identical dress, dialect and culture to Qatari Sunnis. However, there have been a small amount of societal conflicts between Shiites and Sunnis within the country. One notable instance is the attempted demolition of a Shia cemetery near Doha in 2011 by a group of Wahhabi extremists allegedly affiliated with Qatar's Islamic ministry. Upon receiving news of this event, The Emir of Qatar Hamad bin Khalifa condemned the attempt and attended a Shia funeral as a sign of respect.

See also
 Islam by country
 Ministry of Awqaf and Islamic Affairs

Notes

 
Qatar